7449 Döllen, provisional designation , is a stony Florian asteroid from the inner regions of the asteroid belt, approximately  in diameter. It was discovered on 21 August 1949, by German astronomer Karl Reinmuth at the Heidelberg Observatory in southwest Germany. The likely S-type asteroid has a rotation period of 10 hours. It was named after German astronomer Wilhelm Döllen.

Orbit and classification 

Döllen is a member of the Flora family, a giant asteroid family and the largest family of stony asteroids in the main-belt.

It orbits the Sun in the inner asteroid belt at a distance of 1.8–2.7 AU once every 3 years and 4 months (1,211 days; semi-major axis of 2.22 AU). Its orbit has an eccentricity of 0.20 and an inclination of 6° with respect to the ecliptic. The body's observation arc begins at Lowell Observatory in Flagstaff, the night prior to its official discovery observation at Heidelberg.

Physical characteristics 

Döllen is an assumed S-type asteroid, which corresponds to the overall spectral type for Florian asteroids.

Rotation period 

In September 2012, a rotational lightcurve of Döllen was obtained from photometric observations by French amateur astronomer René Roy. Lightcurve analysis gave a tentative rotation period of 10 hours with a brightness amplitude of 0.10 magnitude.

Diameter and albedo 

According to the survey carried out by the NEOWISE mission of NASA's Wide-field Infrared Survey Explorer, Döllen measures 3.389 kilometers in diameter and its surface has an albedo of 0.465, while the Collaborative Asteroid Lightcurve Link assumes an albedo of 0.24 – derived from 8 Flora, the parent body of the Flora family – and calculates a diameter of 3.74 kilometers based on an absolute magnitude of 14.3.

Naming 

This minor planet was named after German astronomer Wilhelm Döllen (1820–1897), for his discussion on errors of heliometer observations. Döllen was an assistant of Friedrich Georg Wilhelm von Struve at the Dorpat Observatory (Tartu Observatory) in Estonia. He also worked on geodetic problems at the Pulkovo Observatory near Saint Petersburg, Russia. The official naming citation was suggested by Lutz Schmadel and published by the Minor Planet Center on 6 August 2009.

References

External links 
 Asteroid Lightcurve Database (LCDB), query form (info )
 Dictionary of Minor Planet Names, Google books
 Asteroids and comets rotation curves, CdR – Observatoire de Genève, Raoul Behrend
 Discovery Circumstances: Numbered Minor Planets (5001)-(10000) – Minor Planet Center
 
 

007449
Discoveries by Karl Wilhelm Reinmuth
Named minor planets
19490821